Lakeridge is a census-designated place (CDP) in Douglas County, Nevada, United States. The population was 371 at the 2010 census.

Geography
Lakeridge is located on the east shore of Lake Tahoe in far western Nevada. U.S. Route 50 is the main road through the CDP, leading south  to the California state line and northeast  to Carson City.

Demographics

References

Census-designated places in Douglas County, Nevada
Census-designated places in Nevada